Hidato (originating from the Hebrew word Hida = Riddle), also known as "Hidoku", is a logic puzzle game invented by Dr. Gyora M. Benedek, an Israeli mathematician. The goal of Hidato is to fill the grid with consecutive numbers that connect horizontally, vertically, or diagonally.  The name Hidato is a registered trademark of Doo-Bee Toys and Games LTD, a company co-founded by Benedek himself. Some publishers use different names for this puzzle such as Number Snake, Snakepit (both of which play on the game's similarity in concept to the video game Snake), Jadium or Numbrix.

About the puzzle
In Hidato, a grid of cells is given. It is usually square-shaped, like Sudoku or Kakuro, but it can also include hexagons or any shape that forms a tessellation. It can have inner holes (like a disc), but it has to be made of only one piece.

The goal is to fill the grid with a series of consecutive numbers adjacent to each other vertically, horizontally, or diagonally.

In every Hidato puzzle the smallest and the highest numbers are given on the grid. There are also other given numbers on the grid (with values between the smallest and the highest) to help direct the player how to start the solution and to ensure that Hidato has a single solution.

Note: the above condition on the smallest or highest numbers are sometimes relaxed: only their values can be given, without their positions on the grid (of course, the difference between these values must be equal to the number of cells in the grid minus one). This may lead to harder puzzles.

Every well-formed Hidato puzzle is supposed to have a unique solution. Moreover, a Hidato puzzle intended for human solvers should have a solution that can be found by (more or less) simple logic. However, there exist very hard Hidato puzzles, even of small size.

Distribution

After Hidato publication, Numbrix puzzles, created by Marilyn vos Savant and appearing in most editions of the weekly magazine Parade, are similar to Hidato except that diagonal moves are not allowed and that all puzzles are square in shape (vos Savant has only used 7×7 and 9×9 grids). Jadium puzzles (formerly Snakepit puzzles), created by Jeff Marchant, are a more difficult version of Numbrix with fewer given numbers and have appeared on the Parade web site regularly since 2014, along with a daily online version of Numbrix.

Solving techniques
As in many logic puzzles, the basic resolution technique consists of analyzing the possibilities for each number of being present in each cell. When a cell can contain only one number (Naked Single) or when a number has only one possible place (Hidden Single), it can be asserted as belonging to the solution.

One key to the solution is, it does not have to be built in ascending (or descending) order; it can be built piecewise, with pieces starting from different givens.

As in the Sudoku case, the resolution of harder Hidato or Numbrix puzzles requires the use of more complex techniques - in particular of various types of chain patterns.

References

External links
Hidato official web site
Hidato Android App

Puzzle video games
Logic puzzles
Israeli inventions